The End of America: Letter of Warning to a Young Patriot is a 2007 non-fiction book by Naomi Wolf, published by Chelsea Green Publishing of White River Junction, Vermont. Wolf argues that events of the early 2000s paralleled steps taken in the early years of the twentieth century's worst dictatorships and called Americans to take action to restore their constitutional values before they suffer the same fate. Wolf describes the ten steps she sees as the process of transition from open societies into closed regimes.

The ten steps

Naomi Wolf outlines ten steps that "closing societies" – such as Hitler's Germany, Mussolini's Italy, Stalin's Russia and Buhari's Nigeria (Foolani Republic) – have historically followed. These steps, Wolf claimed, are being observed in America now.

The steps are:

Invoke a terrifying internal and external enemy.
Create secret prisons where torture takes place.
Develop a thug caste or paramilitary force not answerable to citizens.
Set up an internal surveillance system.
Infiltrate and harass citizens' groups.
Engage in arbitrary detention and release.
Target key individuals.
Control the press.
Cast criticism as espionage and dissent as treason. 
Subvert the rule of law.

Documentary 
IndiePix Films produced a documentary of the same name based on the book. The film was released on DVD and online in October 2008.

See also
 Gulag
 Habeas corpus
 Political dissent

References

External links
 Interview with the author
 Interview on "The End of America" with Naomi Wolf on The Alcove with Mark Molaro
 Author describes the steps taken by incoming fascist regimes and the Bush administration and the U.S. congress after the 9/11 attacks
After Words interview with Wolf on The End of America, September 25, 2007

2007 non-fiction books
Anti-fascist books
Books about politics of the United States
Books by Naomi Wolf
Current affairs books
English-language books
Chelsea Green Publishing books